West Africa (1917–2005) was a weekly news magazine that was published in London for more than 80 years and closed in 2005.

History
West Africa magazine was first published on 3 February 1917 from offices in Fleet Street, London, with the commercial backing of Elder Dempster Shipping Line and the trading company John Holt. It was to appear weekly, initially at a price of sixpence per copy. Its first editorial explained the magazine's raison d'être:

The fabric of the British Empire is complex; but that proportion which constitutes West Africa is in important respects unique. It is that part of Africa nearest to Britain. This is a factor the significance of which has not been fully appreciated until now, when it is clear to all who study maps and statistics that the commercial and food products of West Africa are vitally necessary to the Empire in war, and scarcely less so in peace.

The magazine was intended as "an open forum for the discussion of every question involving the welfare of the peoples of West Africa.... It offers itself as a friend to every cause which holds out a prospect of advancing the position of West Africa as a prosperous and contented member of the Empire...".

Having begun as a source of news about events and issues in the British colonies of West Africa as well as a link between the colonial power and its administrators in the field, for 80 years West Africa magazine was considered a major source of information about the region.

In the mid-1960s it was the target of a successful takeover bid by Cecil Harmsworth King's media empire. In 1978 it began to publish poetry and fiction by some of the continent's leading writers. The literary editor from 1978 was Robert Fraser, followed in 1981 by the Booker Prize-winning novelist Ben Okri. In 1993 a commemorative volume was published, entitled West Africa Over 75 Years: Selections from the Raw Material of History, edited by the magazine's then editor, Kaye Whiteman (1936–2014), and researched by Kole Omotoso, Ferdinand Dennis and Alfred Zack-Williams.

Ownership of the magazine moved from Britain to the government-owned Daily Times of Nigeria. In 1999, West Africa was bought by the Graphic Corporation of Ghana, under the managing directorship of Kofi Badu.

An incomplete run of the magazine is kept in the library of the School of Oriental and African Studies in the University of London, and in several leading European and American university and college libraries.

References

Further reading

News magazines published in the United Kingdom
Weekly magazines published in the United Kingdom
Defunct magazines published in the United Kingdom
Magazines published in London
Magazines established in 1917
Magazines disestablished in 2005
West Africa